Omar Hesham Hussein (born 29 March 1995) is an Egyptian basketball player for Zamalek. He is also a member of the Egypt national basketball team.

Professional career
He has been playing for Zamalek SC since he was a child.
Since 2013, Hesham is on the roster for Zamalek. He was also on the team in the 2021 BAL season, where the team won the first-ever BAL championship. In 2021, he won his second Egyptian Super League championship after 2019 championship.

National team career
Hesham played with the Egypt national basketball team roster for the 2019 FIBA Basketball World Cup qualifiers. He also played with Egypt at FIBA AfroCan 2019, where he averaged 8.3 points over three games. In 2021, he is also on the roster for AfroBasket 2021.

BAL career statistics

|-
|style="text-align:left;background:#afe6ba;"|2021†
|style="text-align:left;"|Zamalek
| 6 || 0 || 16.7 || .409 || .200 || .667 || 1.5 || .8 || .2 || .0 || 4.0
|- class="sortbottom"
| style="text-align:center;" colspan="2"|Career
| 6 || 0 || 16.7 || .409 || .200 || .667 || 1.5 || .8 || .2 || .0 || 4.0

Honours
Zamalek
Basketball Africa League: 2021
Egyptian Basketball Super League: 2018–19, 2020–21

External links
RealGM profile
AfroBasket profile

References

1995 births
Living people
Egyptian men's basketball players
Shooting guards
Zamalek SC basketball players